Stanley Wellington Finch (July 20, 1872 – 22 November 1951) was the first director of the Bureau of Investigation (1908–1912), which would eventually become the FBI.

Life 
Finch was born in Monticello, New York, in 1872. He became a clerk in the United States Department of Justice, where he worked off and on for almost 40 years. Finch rose from the position of clerk to that of chief examiner between 1893 and 1908. It was only while working in the Justice Department that Finch earned his LL.B degree (1908), followed by an LL.M degree (1909) from what is now The George Washington University Law School. He was admitted to the Washington, DC bar in 1911.

Previously when the Justice Department needed to investigate a crime it would borrow Secret Service personnel from the Treasury Department. As chief examiner, Finch advocated setting up a squad of detectives within the Justice Department.

Attorney General Charles Joseph Bonaparte created a Special Agent force, and gave oversight of the force, later named the Bureau of Investigation (BOI), to Finch. Thus he created what would become the FBI.

From 1913 to the 1930s, Finch alternated between private employment—primarily in the novelty manufacturing business—and positions in the Department of Justice. He finally retired from the Department of Justice in 1940.

References 

1872 births
1951 deaths
Directors of the Federal Bureau of Investigation
George Washington University Law School alumni
People from Monticello, New York